Uttaranchal Dental and Medical Research Institute (UDMRI), is a medical and dental institute located in Dehradun, Uttarakhand, India. The college offers five years of Bachelor of Dental Surgery (BDS) degree course at the undergraduate level and 3 years of Master of Dental Surgery (MDS) at the post graduate level. Affiliated to Hemwati Nandan Bahuguna Garhwal University, Srinagar the institution is approved by the Dental Council of India (DCI), Ministry of Health and Family Welfare and the Government of India.

Course 
The Institute imparts BDS (Bachelor in Dental Surgery) and MDS training in accordance with the rules laid down by the Dental Council of India, New Delhi and Hemwati Nandan Bahuguna Garhwal University, Srinagar, Uttarakhand. The Institute is affiliated to the said university for the purpose of examination and award of BDS and MDS Degree.

Total duration of BDS course is 4 years + one year compulsory internship during this period the professional examinations that is one at the end of each academic year, are conducted by the university. After passing the final professional examination it is compulsory to undergo one-year rotatory internship, Degree will be awarded only after completion of internship. Total duration of MDS course is 3 years

Admissions 
Admissions are done on the basis of candidate’s performance in NEET.

Facilities 
 Library
 Laboratories
 Cafeteria
 Accommodation for students 
 Sports
 Computer Lab
 Wi-Fi Connectivity
 Museum
 Extra Curricular Activities

Library 
The library has a seating capacity of 150 and put together are spread over 400sq.mt. This library has a collection of more than 2500 volumes of books. The library ensure provision of all support activities like audio visual room, book bank etc. It has also have subscription to more than 100 journals and magazines of national and international publications. Nearly all the available newspapers are within the easy reach of the students.

References 

http://www.highereducationinindia.com/institutes/uttaranchal-dental-medical-research-5541.php
http://www.euttaranchal.com/education/colleges/uttaranchal-dental-college-medical-research-institute.php
http://www.minglebox.com/college/Uttaranchal-Dental-and-Medical-Research-Institute-Dehradun-UDMRI

Dental colleges in India
Universities and colleges in Dehradun
Science and technology in Dehradun
Educational institutions in India with year of establishment missing